Stewart Levine (born 1946) is an American record producer. He has worked with such artists as The Crusaders, Minnie Riperton, Lionel Richie, Simply Red,  Hugh Masekela, Dr. John, Randy Crawford, B.B. King, Huey Lewis and the News, Patti LaBelle, Sly Stone, Boy George, Peter Blakeley, Joe Cocker, Oleta Adams, Killing Joke, Jon Anderson, Boz Scaggs, Womack and Womack, David Sanborn, Brenda Russell, Lamont Dozier, Curiosity Killed the Cat, Aaron Neville, Everyday People, Jamie Cullum and The Marshall Tucker Band.

Early life
Levine was born and raised in The Bronx. At the age of seven, Levine began his lifelong musical journey by taking up the clarinet. After switching to the saxophone at age twelve, he was playing professionally by fourteen.

At seventeen Levine entered the Manhattan School of Music alongside noted musicians Herbie Hancock, Donald Byrd, and, most importantly, a young South African trumpet player by the name of Hugh Masekela. Levine and Masekela became roommates and lifelong friends.

Career
Levine left the Manhattan School of Music after one year to pursue a career as a horn player and arranger. He very quickly developed his skills as an in-demand arranger on many high-profile pop and R&B recordings. This experience led Levine into forming a production company with Hugh Masekela. They began producing records that were a hybrid of South African township grooves crossed with rhythm and blues and jazz.

They soon left New York and moved to Los Angeles to form Chisa Records, an independent label which received immediate acceptance among the recording community. Levine produced Masekela's ”Grazing in the Grass,” which became a #1 pop single, quickly selling over two million copies.

While in California, Levine met members of The Jazz Crusaders, a group who had already built a small, but loyal, following. Levine signed them to Chisa Records with the idea of combining the funk of their native Texas alongside the jazz for which they were known. This was the beginning of a style that would become known as jazz-funk and, later, “Rare Groove.” Levine produced over a dozen albums with The Crusaders, many of which were certified gold and considered classics.

In 1974, Levine came up with the idea of putting together a music festival Zaire 74 in Kinshasa set around The Rumble in the Jungle boxing match - the Ali/Foreman fight in Zaire. He produced the festival, which brought together the greats of soul music alongside Africa's greatest artists. The entire event was filmed and eventually released in 1996 as the award-winning documentary When We Were Kings.

He returned to recording, producing Minnie Riperton’s third album, Adventures in Paradise. This album is believed by many to be a template for the neo-soul movement, and has influenced artists such as D’Angelo and Jill Scott, as well as many others. This led to a very productive period in which he produced albums by Van Morrison, Motown legend Lamont Dozier’s Peddlin’ Music on the Side, which featured the classic “Goin’ Back to My Roots,” and the début album of Randy Crawford.

From here he developed a close relationship with Phil Walden and Capricorn Records, producing a series of gold albums with southern rock artists The Marshall Tucker Band, as well as The Allman Bros. Band side project Sea Level and Dixie Dregs.

He then produced the first of six albums with blues legend B.B. King. Midnight Believer was an instant hit, putting B.B. back on the charts with a gold album after a long absence. This was quickly followed by B.B.’s Grammy winning There Must Be a Better World Somewhere.

In 1982 Levine produced “Up Where We Belong” with Joe Cocker and Jennifer Warnes. Used as the end title song to the film An Officer and a Gentleman, “Up Where We Belong” became a #1 pop hit, Grammy winner and Academy Award winner. He then produced Sly and the Family Stone’s début album for Warner Bros. Records.

Next came Womack & Womack’s debut Love Wars. In England it quickly became a critic’s darling and a #1 album. Due to the overwhelming success of this album, Levine found himself being courted by many English A&R men, eager for him to work with their artists. He moved to London and began working with a wide range of acts from the techno dance group Blancmange to the cult band Killing Joke.

Levine was invited by an A&R man to see a new band from Manchester named Simply Red play their first gig in London. He describes the moment: “The lead singer was magical but the music sounded like a retro American soul revue. I wasn’t interested in this kind of sound. I met with Mick Hucknall and told him that we needed to come up with something fresh, not just revisit the past.”

The result was Simply Red’s début album Picture Book, which instantly became a huge hit in both England and America. Propelled by the international #1 single, “Holding Back the Years,” it quickly sold over seven million copies worldwide. Levine produced Curiosity Killed the Cat’s Keep Your Distance in a similar “soul” style. It contained two top ten singles and became a #1 album in England and Europe. He followed this with Boy George’s first solo album, Sold, containing the reggae influenced #1 hit single “Everything I Own.”

Next came Simply Red’s A New Flame, which included the international #1 version of “If You Don’t Know Me By Now.” A New Flame sold over eight million copies, but the best was yet to come. In 1991 he produced Simply Red’s Stars, which became one of the largest selling albums in British history, and was the highest selling album in Britain for two consecutive years. Stars contained four UK hit singles, sold 3.5 million copies in the UK and over eleven million copies worldwide. He also produced the Everyday People 1990 album You Wash... I'll Dry.

Next he produced three new songs for Lionel Richie’s greatest hits album Back to Front. He then produced Dr. John’s Grammy award winning album Goin’ Back to New Orleans, as well as albums for Huey Lewis and The News, Oleta Adams and Ireland's Hot House Flowers. He returned to England to produce Simply Red's next album, Life, which included the group's only UK #1 single, “Fairground.”

After this album, Levine decided to take a break from the studio to concentrate on composing and playing the saxophone. “I was burnt out,” he says, “I needed to refuel.” He emerged re-energized in 2002, producing a reunion album with his old friends The Crusaders. This was followed by another reunion, this time with Simply Red. Levine produced their hit version of “You Make Me Feel Brand New,” as well as their single "Sunrise," putting them back on the charts. Next came David Sanborn’s first new album in many years, Time Again, which stayed as the #1 jazz album for many months.

In the summer of 2003 Levine was asked to work with a young British jazz artist by the name of Jamie Cullum. Levine produced Jamie’s debut album Twenty Something, which became a massive crossover hit, selling 1.3 million copies in England and over 2.5 million copies worldwide.

Levine followed this by producing the Dr. John’s N’Awlinz: Dis, Dat or D’udda, which featured a who’s who of New Orleans’ greatest musicians alongside guests such as B.B. King, Willie Nelson, Mavis Staples and Randy Newman. He returned to England to produce Jamie Cullum's second album Catching Tales, which has established Jamie as an international star.

Levine has most recently produced Aaron Neville’s début for Sony-BMG. The Soul Classics is a collection of some of the most memorable and loved R&B songs of all time. Levine called upon many old friends, including Joe Sample, David Sanborn and Ray Parker Jr. to accompany Aaron in a style suited to his distinctive, interpretive powers.

As far as Levine is concerned, that is the function of a producer. “To me,” he says, “It’s about framing the artist properly. I guess it goes back to my early days as an arranger. It didn’t matter how brilliant the arrangements were if you didn’t make the singer sound their best. That was the only reason they hired you again!”

Sources
 
 

1946 births
Living people
People from the Bronx
Record producers from New York (state)
American Jews